The 2010–11 FIS Ski Jumping World Cup was the 32nd World Cup season in ski jumping and the 14th official World Cup season in ski flying. It began on 28 November 2010 at the Rukatunturi ski jumping hill in Kuusamo, Finland, and finished on 20 March 2011 at Planica, Slovenia.

The defending champion was Simon Ammann. The overall World Cup was won by Thomas Morgenstern. It was his second triumph after the 2007–08 season. Ammann placed second, and Adam Małysz placed third. It was also Adam Małysz's last season before retirement. The ski flying World Cup was won by Gregor Schlierenzauer for the second time. The nations cup and the FIS Team Tour were won by Austria. The Nordic Tournament was not held due to the 2011 FIS Nordic World Ski Championships in Oslo, Norway.

Season titles

Map of world cup hosts 
All 17 locations which have been hosting world cup events for men this season. Events in Harrachov were canceled. Oberstdorf hosted FIS Team Tour and four hills tournament.

 Four Hills Tournament
 FIS Team Tour (Oberstdorf ski flying events included)

Calendar

Men

Men's team

Standings

Overall

Ski Flying

Notes

References 

World cup
World cup
FIS Ski Jumping World Cup